Phosphorus trifluorodichloride is a chemical compound with the chemical formula PF3Cl2. The covalent molecule trigonal bipyramidal molecular geometry. The central phosphorus atom has sp3d hybridization, and the molecule has an asymmetric charge distribution. It appears as a colorless gas with a disagreeable odor which turns to a liquid at -8 °C.

Phosphorus trifluorodichloride is formed by mixing phosphorus trifluoride with chlorine PF3 + Cl2 → PF3Cl2

The P-F bond length is 1.546 Å for equatoria position and 1.593 for the axial position and the P-Cl bond length is 2.004 Å. The chlorine atoms are in equatorial positions in the molecule.

References

Phosphorus(V) compounds
Fluorine compounds
Chlorine(−I) compounds
Gases